William Phelip, 6th Baron Bardolf (died 6 June 1441), KG, was an English landowner, soldier, politician, and administrator from Dennington in Suffolk.

Origins
He was the elder son of John Phelip (died 1407), a landowner at  Dennington in Suffolk, and his second wife Juliana Erpingham (died 1414), daughter of Sir John Erpingham (died 1370) and sister of the soldier and administrator Sir Thomas Erpingham. He had a younger brother Sir John Phelip MP and two sisters: Rose, who married John Glemham, and Catherine who married Sir Andrew Butler MP, of Waldingfield.

Career
He is described as being a valiant soldier in the wars in France during the reign of King Henry V. He became Treasurer of the King's Household, and on the king's decease had the chief conduct of his funeral. He is said to have been created Lord Bardolf by letters patent of King Henry VI, but it does not appear that he ever had a summons to Parliament, although he bore that title. He was later appointed a  Knight of the Garter and served as Chamberlain to King Henry VI. By letters patent dated 23 October 1440 Sir William Phelip held the lordship of Horstead Manor.

Marriage and children
He married Joan Bardolf (d.pre-1447), a daughter and co-heiress of Thomas Bardolf, 5th Lord Bardolf. She died before 1447, as in that year the executors of Joan, Lady Bardolf, sold her property of Erpingham manor, in St. Martin's at the Palace, at Norwich, to William Calthorpe. By Joan he left one daughter and sole heiress:
Elizabeth Phelip, who married John Beaumont, 1st Viscount Beaumont (c.1409-1460), the first Viscount to be created in England, who died at the Battle of Northampton.

Acquires Bardolf barony and reversion
By his marriage to a daughter and co-heiress of the attainted Thomas Bardolf, 5th Lord Bardolf he acquired the title Baron Bardolf. Lord Bardolf's estates had been divided between Thomas Beaufort, 1st Duke of Exeter, the King's half-brother, George de Dunbar, 10th Earl of March, and the Queen, but the latter's share, on petition to the king by the husbands of both his daughters, namely Sir William de Clifford, and his wife Anne Bardolf and of Sir William Phelip and his wife Joan Bardolf, the reversion after the Queen's death was granted to the representatives of the attainted Thomas Bardolf, 5th Lord Bardolf.

Death and burial
He died on 6 June 1441 and was buried in the South Chapel of St Mary's Church, Dennington, Suffolk, where survives his monument with recumbent effigies of himself and his wife. The Norfolk Visitations mention the will, dated 1 September 1438, of William Phelipp, Lord Bardolf, in which John Heydon, esquire, was appointed one of the executors.

Notes

References
 Corder, Joan, FSA., editor, The Visitation of Suffolk 1561 made by William Hervy, Clarenceux King of Arms, London, 1981, part 1, p. 186.

Bardolf, Sir William Phelip, Lord
Phelip, Sir William
6
Year of birth unknown